Pahalawela is a village in Sri Lanka. It is located within Central Province.

See also
List of towns in Central Province, Sri Lanka

External links

Populated places in Matale District